Pobierowo  is a village in the administrative district of Gmina Rewal, within Gryfice County, West Pomeranian Voivodeship, in north-western Poland.

For the history of the region, see History of Pomerania.

The village has a population of 1,084.

References

External links
 Pobierowo - Photo Gallery

Villages in Gryfice County